Firestick, fire-stick or fire stick may refer to:

Plants
 Firestick plant, Euphorbia tirucalli
 Firestick tree, Premna acuminata

Religion and mythology
 A ceremonial pole
 The parents of the god Agni
 A symbol of the goddess Vesta
 An historical time for the Athi people
 Part of a meditative ritual in the Kaivalya Upanishad

Other uses
 A firelighting tool
 Fire Stick, winner of the 1984 D.C. McKay Stakes horse race
 A Zulu name for bishop William Taylor (1821–1902)
 Pyrobaculum (Latin: fire stick), a single celled organism
 A fictional device in the TV series Fireman

See also
 Old Fire Stick, a 1986 reggae album by Frankie Jones
 "Old Fire Stick", a 1990 single by Aswad, produced by Gussie Clarke
 Fire-stick farming, a method of land management in Australia
 
 Fire iron
 Fire lance, a weapon
 Fire staff